The cupola sign is seen on a supine chest or abdominal radiograph in the presence of pneumoperitoneum.

It refers to dependent air that rises within the abdominal cavity of the supine patient to accumulate underneath the central tendon of the diaphragm in the midline. It is seen as lucency overlying the lower thoracic vertebral bodies. The superior border is well defined, but the inferior margin is not.

Term
"Cupola" is an architectural term, referring to a small dome (in particular, a small dome crowning a roof or a turret). The word derives from a Latin word for a "little cup".

References

 Marshall Geoffrey B. “The Cupola Sign.” Radiology 241, no. 2 (November 1, 2006): 623–624. doi:10.1148/radiol.2412040700.
 Fleming J, Honour H, Pevsner N. The Penguin Dictionary of Architecture: Fourth Edition. Penguin Books. . Read it at Google Books - Find it at Amazon

Radiologic signs